The Morane-Borel military monoplane was an unsuccessful French single-engine, multi-seat prototype aircraft built in 1911 for the Reims Military Aviation Competition hosted by the French Army. The aircraft only met one of the requirements and was eliminated from the competition.

Design
The military monoplane was derived from Morane-Borel's successful single-seat monoplane, enlarged and reinforced to carry the pilot and two passengers. It was a mid-wing tractor configuration monoplane powered by a  Gnome double Omega 14-cylinder rotary engine driving a two-bladed propeller. The fuselage was a rectangular-section, wire-braced box girder, with only the forward part covered. The two-spar wings were given a trapezoidal shape, lengthened by seven ribs, and retained the elliptical ends of the earlier aircraft. The wings were braced by two pyramidal cabanes in front of the pilot, one on each side of the fuselage, and an inverted V-strut underneath the fuselage, behind the landing gear. Additional pairs of guy-wires were added to reinforce the longer wings. 

Lateral control was effected by wing warping and the empennage consisted of a fixed horizontal stabilizer with tip-mounted full-chord elevators at the ends and a vertical stabilizer. The undercarriage was reinforced by the addition of an extra strut fastened to the forward end of the fuselage and consisted of two pairs of three strut assemblies, each with a pair of wheels on an axle and a skid, and a double tailskid.

History
In mid-1911, the French Army decided to sponsor a competitive event to be held at Reims in October. The first prize was 700,000 francs plus additional sums for increases in speed over 60 km/h, as well as a commitment by the military to purchase 10 aircraft. The Morane-Borel leadership and its chief designer, Raymond Saulnier, decided to build an entry to demonstrate the principles behind its race-winning predecessor and to serve as an advertisement for the company. Piloted by Jules Védrines, the aircraft successfully took off from a wet plowed field. It flew carrying one passenger, but failed to lift the required mass due to the weight of its reinforced structure and was eliminated from the competition.

Specifications
From: Lacaze & Lherbert, Morane Saulnier: ses avions, ses projets, p. 16

References

Bibliography

 
 

1910s French military aircraft
Single-engined tractor aircraft
Aircraft first flown in 1911
Mid-wing aircraft
Rotary-engined aircraft
Borel aircraft
Morane-Saulnier aircraft